Bagh Ali-ye Sofla (also Romanized as Bāgh ‘Alī-ye Soflá and Bāgh-e ‘Alī-ye Soflá; also known as Bāgh ‘Alī-ye Pā’ īn) is a village in Zhan Rural District, in the Central District of Dorud County, Lorestan Province, Iran. At the 2006 census, its population was 25, in 6 families.

References 

Towns and villages in Dorud County